The men's pairs all-around competition at the 2017 World Games in Wrocław was played on 25 July. 12 acrobatic gymnastics competitors, from 6 nations, participated in the tournament. The acrobatic gymnastics competition took place at Centennial Hall in Lower Silesian Voivodeship.

Competition format
The top 4 teams in qualifications, based on combined scores of each apparatus, advanced to the final. In the final, each team selected three gymnasts to compete on each apparatus. All scores on each apparatus were summed to give a final team score. The scores in qualification do not count in the final.

Qualification

Final

Final standing

Medalists

See also
Acrobatic gymnastics at the 2017 World Games – Men's group all-around
Acrobatic gymnastics at the 2017 World Games – Women's pairs all-around
Acrobatic gymnastics at the 2017 World Games – Mixed pairs all-around

References
Qualification round balance results
Qualification round dynamic results
Final round results

External links
 Result on IWGA website

Men's pairs all-around